Samantha Slimp Shaw (born February 10, 1957) is an American politician. She is a Republican who served as State Auditor of Alabama from 2007 to 2015. She was also a member of the Executive Committee of the Alabama Republican Party.

Biography
Shaw was born in Homewood, Alabama to June Daly and William M. 'Bill' Slimp. She graduated from Auburn University and was employed as an accountant for the Shaw Oil Company, for a branch of La-Z-Boy Furniture Gallery, and for Alabama Steel Supply. She has also worked as a bookkeeper and office manager. In 1980, she married attorney Gregory Shaw. The couple have lived in Montgomery, Alabama for over 23 years, and have two sons.

Political career
In 2000, she was manager of her husband's successful campaign for Judge of the Alabama Court of Criminal Appeals, and in 2006 was manager of his successful re-election campaign. Gregory Shaw was elected to the Alabama Supreme Court in 2008.

In 2002, Shaw was the Deputy Finance Director for the re-election campaign of U.S. Senator Jeff Sessions.

In 2006, Shaw ran for State Auditor. She finished second of four candidates in the Republican primary, with 26.4% of the vote, and won the run-off with 50.8%. She won in the general election with 54.1%.

In 2010, Shaw was elected to a second term as State Auditor, winning with 62.7% of the vote.

References

External links
State Auditor of Alabama - official biography 
 
Profile at BhamWiki

1957 births
Alabama Republicans
Methodists from Alabama
Auburn University alumni
Living people
People from Homewood, Alabama
State Auditors of Alabama
Women state constitutional officers of Alabama